Campinas (Plains or Meadows) is a Brazilian municipality in São Paulo State, part of the country's Southeast Region. According to the 2020 estimate, the city's population is 1,213,792, making it the fourteenth most populous Brazilian city and the third most populous municipality in São Paulo state. The city's metropolitan area, Metropolitan Region of Campinas, contains twenty municipalities with a total population of 3,656,363 people.

Etymology
Campinas means grass fields in Portuguese and refers to its characteristic landscape, which originally comprised large stretches of dense subtropical forests (mato grosso or thick woods in Portuguese), mainly along the many rivers, interspersed with gently rolling hills covered by low-lying vegetation.

Campinas' official crest and flag has a picture of the mythical bird, the phoenix, because it was practically reborn after a devastating epidemic of yellow fever in the 1800s, which killed more than 25% of the city's inhabitants.

History

The city was founded on July 14, 1774, by Barreto Leme. It was initially a simple outpost on the way to Minas Gerais and Goiás serving the "Bandeirantes" who were in search of precious minerals and Indian slaves. In the first half of the 19th century, Campinas became a growing population center, with many coffee, cotton and sugarcane farms.

The construction of a railway linking the city of São Paulo to Santos' seaport, in 1867, was very important for its growth. In the second half of the 19th century, with the abolition of slavery, farming and industrialization attracted many foreign immigrants to replace the lost manpower, mainly from Italy.

Coffee became an important export and the city became wealthy. In consequence, a large service sector was established to serve the growing population, and in the first decades of the 20th century, Campinas could already boast of an opera house, theaters, banks, movie theaters, radio stations, a philharmonic orchestra, two newspapers (Correio Popular and Diário do Povo), a good public education system (with the Escola Normal de Campinas and the Colégio Culto à Ciência), and hospitals, such as the Santa Casa de Misericórdia (a charity for poor people).

And the Casa de Saúde de Campinas (for the Italian community, formerly known as Circolo Italiani Uniti), and the most important Brazilian research center in agricultural sciences, the Instituto Agronômico de Campinas, which was founded by Emperor Pedro II. Finally, the construction of the first Brazilian highway in 1938, between Campinas and São Paulo, the Anhanguera Highway, was a turning point in the integration of Campinas into the rest of the state.

Campinas was the birthplace of opera composer Carlos Gomes (1836 — 1896) and of the President of the Republic Campos Salles (1841 — 1913). It was home for 49 years to Hércules Florence, reputed as one of the early inventors of photography, photocopying and the mimeograph.

Geography

Its neighboring cities are Paulínia, Jaguariúna and Pedreira, north; Morungaba, Itatiba and Valinhos in the east; Itupeva, Indaiatuba and Monte Mor, south, and Hortolândia in the west.

Ecology
Most of the original vegetation of the city was largely eliminated. Like 13 other municipalities in the metropolitan region of Campinas, the city is subject to some environmental stress, and Campinas is considered one of the areas liable to flooding and silting; it now has less than 5% of vegetation cover in total area.

Trying to reverse this situation, several projects have been and are being conducted and planned, such as building corridors, and the regulation of the Management Plan of Environmental Preservation Area (APA) in Campinas. There are also several environmental projects to combat the destruction of riparian forests located along the banks of the Atibaia river, which has a high level of pollution. Today, Campinas houses the area of relevant ecological interest (ARIE) Mata de Santa Genebra, established in 1985 by the city of Campinas' Fundação José Pedro de Oliveira and regulated by the Brazilian Environment and Renewable Natural Resources Institute (IBAMA). This is the now second-largest urban forest of Brazil, behind only the Tijuca Forest, in Rio de Janeiro.

The city also has smaller urban forest groves and reserve parks, such as the Bosque dos Jequitibas (installed in 1881), the Bosque dos Italianos (transl. Italian's Grove), the Bosque dos Alemães (transl. German's Grove), Guarantã's Park, as well as the larger Parque Portugal (Taquaral Lagoon, transl. Park and Lagoon of Bamboos), "Dom Bosco" Ecological Park and Monsenhor "Emílio José Salim" Ecological Park.

Climate

The city has a dry-winter tropical climate (Aw type in the Köppen classification, with dry winters and hot months).

The lowest temperature recorded in the city was 3.0 °C on June 25, 1918. The highest temperature was 39.0 °C, observed on 17 November 1985. The highest cumulative rainfall recorded in 24 hours in the city between June 1988 and October 2008 was 143.4 mm there are also episodes of strong winds, with gusts exceeding 100 km / h, and training records were made in the city day May 4, 2001, and March 9, 2008.

Demographics

According to the 2010 IBGE Census, as of November 2010, Campinas had a population of 1,080,999 and a population density of 1358.6 (inhabitants / km ²). Infant mortality levels were at up to 1 year (per thousand): 14.05 and life expectancy in the city was 72.22 years. The fertility rate was at 1.78 children per woman. 96.01 of the populace could read.

 Human Development Index (HDI-M): 0.852 (high)
 HDI-M Income: 0.845 (high)
 HDI-M Longevity: 0.787
 HDI-M Education: 0.925 (very high)

(Source: DATA)

Ethnicity
Source: 2010 census:

Composition
Source: 2010 Census
Population (IBGE): 1,080,999

Metropolitan region

The Campinas Metropolitan area also comprehends a gross domestic product (GDP) of R$70.7 billion (around U$42 billion).

 Americana
 Artur Nogueira
 Cosmópolis
 Engenheiro Coelho
 Holambra
 Hortolândia
 Indaiatuba
 Itatiba
 Jaguariúna
 Monte Mor
 Nova Odessa
 Paulínia
 Pedreira
 Santa Bárbara d'Oeste
 Santo Antônio de Posse
 Sumaré
 Valinhos
 Vinhedo

The Campinas municipality is also the administrative center of the micro- and meso-regions of the same name. The micro-region includes the RMC (Metropolitan Region of Campinas) and the municipality of Elias Fausto; the meso-region also includes the following municipalities: Aguaí, Amparo, Águas da Prata, Águas de Lindóia, Caconde, Casa Branca, Divinolândia, Espírito Santo do Pinhal, Estiva Gerbi, Itapira, Itobi, Lindóia, Mococa, Mogi Guaçu, Moji-Mirim, Monte Alegre do Sul, Pedra Bela, Pinhalzinho, Pirassununga, Porto Ferreira, Santa Cruz das Palmeiras, Santo Antônio do Jardim, São João da Boa Vista, São José do Rio Pardo, São Sebastião da Grama, Serra Negra, Socorro, Tambaú, Tapiratiba, Vargem Grande do Sul and Vinhedo.

Other cities which are geographically, historically or economically tied to the meso-region of Campinas could be mentioned: Araras, Atibaia, Bragança Paulista, Capivari, Conchal, Iracemápolis, Itu, Itupeva, Jarinu, Jundiai, Limeira, Louveira, Mombuca, Morungaba, Piracicaba, Rafard, Rio das Pedras, Salto and Tuiuti.

Economy

Campinas is the richest city in the metropolitan region of Campinas and the 10th richest city in Brazil, showing a gross domestic product (GDP) of 36.68 billion reais (2010), which represents almost 1% (0.998%) of all Brazilian GDP. Currently, the city concentrates 10% of industrial production of Brazil. The paper highlights the high-tech industries and metallurgical park, considered the capital of Silicon Valley Sterling.

The region hosts 17,677 industries, the second largest number in the State of São Paulo.

The petrochemical complex is centered in the Southeastern section, a few miles from Campinas, near the refinery of Petrobras Planalto Paulista (Replan), the largest in Brazil one of the largest in Latin America, and has companies like Dupont, Chevron, Shell, Exxon, Group Ipiranga, Eucatex, Rhodia, and others. It is the hub of companies and Blue Trip. The largest companies have a global turnover of more than $80 billion, larger than many Latin American countries.

The city has several shopping malls, two of the largest being Iguatemi Campinas and Shopping Parque Dom Pedro. Campinas has, within its metropolitan area, the largest cargo airport for import/export, Viracopos International Airport, a significant entity in the international transport of cargo.

Campinas' main economic activities are agriculture (mainly coffee, sugarcane, and cotton), industry (textiles, motorcycles, cars, machinery, agricultural equipment, food and beverages, chemical and petrochemical, pharmaceuticals, paper and cellulose, telecommunications, computers and electronics, etc.), commerce and services.

The Campinas Metropolitan Region is home to many national and international high-tech industries and IT companies, including IBM, Dell, Motorola, NXP, Lucent, Nortel, Compaq, Celestica, Samsung, Alcatel, Bosch, 3M, Texas Instruments, CI&T and Daitan.

The airline TRIP Linhas Aéreas is headquartered in Campinas. The Viracopos airport is also the operational hub of Azul Airlines.

The automotive industry is also heavily represented: General Motors, Mercedes-Benz, Honda, Magneti Marelli, Eaton Corporation, Tenneco, Toyota and many others are present. It also has a sizable pharmaceutical industry sector, with companies like Medley Farma, EMS Farma, Altana, Merck Sharp and Dohme, Cristália, Valeo, etc.

In addition the region is home to many research centers and universities, such as the Brazilian Synchrotron Light Laboratory, Brazilian Nanotechnology National Laboratory, National Laboratory of Science and Technology of Bioethanol, Brazilian Biosciences National Laboratory, Centro de Pesquisa e Desenvolvimento em Telecomunicações (CPqD), CenPRA, Embrapa, Unicamp, Facamp and Puccamp. According to the Times Higher Education 2007 World University Rankings, the University of Campinas (Unicamp) is the 177th best university in the world, and the 2nd best in Latin America (after the University of São Paulo in 176th place).

Campinas also boasts the largest number of high-tech business incubators and industrial parks (a total of eight), such as the CIATEC I and II, Softex, TechnoPark, InCamp, Polis, TechTown, Industrial Park of Campinas, and others.

The presence of one of the largest oil refineries in Latin America ( of crude per day), operated by Petrobras in the neighboring county of Paulínia, has attracted many petrochemical companies to the Campinas area, including DuPont, Rhone-Poulenc, and Royal Dutch Shell.

The Brazilian Pró-Álcool Program was developed in Campinas: a whole industry based on the use of ethanol as a combustible for motor vehicles, going from a new sucrose-rich sugarcane, to alcohol refineries, a huge distribution system, and, most recently, an internal combustion engine capable of using either gasoline or ethanol.

Other examples of Campinas-bred technologies are fiber optics, lasers for telecommunications and medical applications, integrated circuits design and fabrication, satellite environmental monitoring of natural resources, software for agriculture, digital telephone switches, deep-water oil exploration platforms and technologies, biomedical equipment, medical software, genetic engineering and recombinant DNA technologies for food production and pharmaceutics, and food engineering. Because of this, Campinas has been called the Brazilian Silicon Valley.

Socio-economic conditions
Despite Campinas' position of wealth and social and economic opportunity vis-a-vis the rest of the country, the average per capita income of little more than US$17,700 per year clearly indicates that there are problems. If re-evaluated in terms of PPP (Purchasing Power Parity), Campinas' average income looks better (roughly US$12,300 per year).

Culture

The responsible for the cultural sector of Campinas is the City Department of Culture, which aims to plan and implement the cultural policy of the municipality through the development of programs, projects, and activities aimed at cultural development.
The city has always been a cultural center in the State of São Paulo. This has increased greatly with the proliferation of universities. Campinas has three theater houses, a symphony orchestra, (considered one of the three best of the country), now under Principal Conductor Parcival Módolo and Karl Martin, classical music ensembles, choral groups, 43 movie screens and over a dozen cinemas, dozens of libraries (including a municipal library), art galleries, museums, etc.

Tourism and recreation
Tourist attractions include:
 the Bosque dos Jequitibás, an urban preserved wooded area reminiscent of the original rain forest that covered the region in the past: it has a small zoo with local fauna and a natural history museum
 the cathedral, which was built in the 19th century; its interior is entirely made of jacaranda wood sculptures and works. It was made using a technique called "taipa de pilão" using clay and rocks – it is one of the largest buildings in the world using this construction technique;
 the Central Market, with typical stall stands full of the fresh products of the region
 the old Central Railway Station, now converted to a cultural center;
 Centro de Convivência, a cultural complex of theater, an open arena for concerts and spectacles, and a plaza where Campinas Symphony Orchestra often plays to the public, during on Sundays this place receive many art exhibitors known by most people as  Hippie Fair.

 the Castelo (Castle) Water Tower, which provides views over the downtown;
 the Historical Railway Society of Campinas, which maintains the Anhumas station, a set of steam locomotives and full carriages and which promotes regular trips along a picturesque region dotted with old coffee farms;
 the Lagoa do Taquaral Park, a much-beloved urban lagoon and adjacent wooded park, includes: a planetarium, a science museum, an indoor sports stadium and swimming pool, kart racing (now deactivated) and model airplane areas, an open concert auditorium, a floating caravel replica, an electric tramway (streetcar line), pedalos, plus facilities for several types of sports, including a long track for running and walking;
Campinas' readers of the Correio Popular newspaper and the Cosmo Website voted in July 2007 for the "Seven Wonders of Campinas".

The mountain region around Campinas has better travel and stay opportunities, such as in the spa cities of Serra Negra and Águas de Lindóia; and in Holambra, a rural region which was populated by immigrants from the Netherlands, with an annual flower festival and typical buildings and restaurants.

Seven Wonders of Campinas

The Seven Wonders of Campinas is a list of the most popular tourism spots in the city of Campinas, as voted for by the readers of Correio Popular newspaper and the Cosmo On-Line web portal. They are:

Culture Station

The old train station of Companhia Paulista Railways, a symbol of the city of Campinas and of the development of the State of São Paulo, changed its name, was restored and converted into an important center for recreation and culture for the entire population. Workshops, concerts and other cultural activities are held throughout the year.

Metropolitan Cathedral
The construction of the Cathedral began in October 1807 and extended for more than seventy years until its inauguration in December 1883. The entire structure was made of compressed clay, a construction technique of old tradition in São Paulo. The internal decoration is made of dark jacaranda wood, The four bells in the main tower are a century old.

Parque Portugal
Aimed at leisure and sports, the "Bamboo Grove Lagoon" brings together a wide variety of recreational and cultural resources, such as paddleboats, an exact replica of the caravel ship that brought Pedro Álvares Cabral to discover Brazil, picnic groves, bird nurseries; an area with fitness equipment, playgrounds, snack bar, restrooms and a scenic  electric tramway that is operated by restored historic tramcars once used for regular transportation in Campinas.

Jockey Club Building
Inaugurated in 1925, this building held the headquarters of the Jockey Club of Campinas. The building has a classic facade and interior inspired by French palaces of the late 18th century.

Old Market
Located in the central region of Campinas, the Municipal Market, better known as "Mercadão", was inaugurated on April 12, 1908, by Mayor Orosimbo Maia. The work of architect Ramos de Azevedo, is still working today, with its colorful stalls full of fresh produce from the fields.

Army Cadets School
The project, in Spanish colonial style, was designed and conducted by the architect Ernani Do Val Penteado and inaugurated on January 23, 1959. Since 1961 the Escola Preparatória de Cadetes do Exército (Preparatory School of the Brazilian Army) of Campinas has become the legitimate custodian of the traditions of the preparatory education of the Brazilian Army. Its one-year course has university level and prepares the future cadets of the Academia Militar das Agulhas Negras.

Castle Tower
This water tower was built between 1936 and 1940 in the highest altitude point inside the urban area, 735 meters above sea level. From its gazebo on the top, one can enjoy a wide panorama view of the city.

Other tourist spots
A number of other attractions were voted in the poll:

Sports

Campinas is home to two football clubs nationally recognized: Associação Atlética Ponte Preta and Guarani Futebol Clube, who perform "Campineiro derby" match that is considered one of the most traditional of the state occurring since 1912. There is also Red Bull Brasil, which was created in November 2007 and lately has gained significant prominence. Women's football also has been outstanding, albeit amateur. In the story also revealed other clubs, such as Mogiana Sports Club, which was created on June 7, 1933, and came into bankruptcy in the 60s.

The city also has three major venues: Estádio Brinco de Ouro da Princesa, owned by Guarani, which opened in 1953 and today has a capacity of around 29,130 people, Sport and Recreation Centre in Campinas Dr. Horacio Antonio da Costa (Cerecamp Stadium or Mogiana Stadium), which belongs to the state of São Paulo and was opened in 1940, right by the Estádio Moisés Lucarelli, owned by Ponte Preta, which was built by its own supporters, and founded in 1948 and has the capacity to 19,728 visitors. It is popularly known as "Majestoso" (The Majestic One), for being the third-largest stadium in Brazil as the year of its foundation (1948), smaller only than Pacaembu, in São Paulo and São Januário, in Rio de Janeiro.

The city is still home to several sporting events in other modalities, such as Corrida Integração (Integration Race), which is held since 1983 by Pioneer Broadcasters Television (EPTV), being divided into two modes (a 5 km-dedicated to disabled people and wheelchair users, and another 10 km, for non-disabled people).

Campinas also has a tradition in the Open Games of the Interior, created in 1936, and competition involving various sports. Four times, hosted the competition (1939, 1945, 1960, and 1994), and ten times the city came out as the winner of the competition (1939, 1955, 1956, 1958, 1960, 1971, 1974, 1975, 1978, 1979), being the third city which has won the most competition.

In tennis, there is the Tennis Club of Campinas (CBT), which was created in 1913, offering, in addition to the blocks of the sport, swimming pools, courts for basketball and soccer, as well as rooms suitable for the practice of judo, gymnastics, and dance. Club de Regatas Campineiro and Swim (CCRN) also provides space for the practice of various types of Olympic sports.

Government

The municipality is subdivided into one main district and four subdistricts, Joaquim Egídio, Sousas, Barão Geraldo and Nova Aparecida. There are also 14 regional administrations.

The Secretariat of International Cooperation (SMCI) was created on April 28, 1994. It is one of the 18 Secretariats of the City Hall of Campinas and it is currently located in that building.

Its main goals are:
 the attraction and facilitation for the arrival of new investments to the city;
 the expansion of the companies activities that are already established in the city;
 the perpetuation of the relations between the city, its international community, and partners, such as the Sister-Cities.

The Secretariat also acts as a supporter to other secretariats in the City Hall, often through: the identification of national and foreign potentials investors; keeping systematic contacts with executives in Brazil and abroad, Embassies, Chambers of Commerces and relevant International Organizations; presenting Campinas to the cities and interested investors.

Mayors

 Orozimbo Maia – 1904, 1908–1910, 1926–1930
 Ruy Hellmeister Novais – 1956–1959, 1964–1969
 Orestes Quércia – 1969–1972
 Lauro Péricles Gonçalves; 1973–1976
 Francisco Amaral; 1977–1982, 1997–2001
 José Roberto Magalhães Teixeira – 1983–1988, 1993–1996 (died of hepatic cancer while in office)
 Jacó Bittar – 1989–1992
 Antonio da Costa Santos (Toninho) – 2001 (murdered while in office)
 Izalene Tiene – 2001–2005
 Hélio de Oliveira Santos (Dr. Hélio) – 2005–2011 (deposed)
 Demétrio Vilagra – 2011(removed)
 Pedro Serafim Júnior – 2011
 Demétrio Vilagra – 2011 (deposed)
 Pedro Serafim Júnior – 2011–2012 (interim)
 Jonas Donizette  – 2013–2020
 Dário Saadi – 2021–present

Infrastructure

Transportation
Campinas is a major transportation and telecommunications hub for the State of São Paulo, as it is located on the major motorways that connect the capital to the Northwest and Northern parts of the State. The city is served by the Campinas Beltway (Anel Viário) and the following main motorways:
 Rodovia Anhangüera
 Rodovia dos Bandeirantes
 Rodovia Santos Dumont
 Rodovia Dom Pedro I
 Rodovia Adhemar de Barros
 Rodovia Professor Zeferino Vaz
 Rodovia Jornalista Francisco Aguirre Proença
All these motorways are built according to the highest international standards (see highway system of São Paulo). The Anel Viário José Magalhães Teixeira (SP-038) around the city currently interconnects the Anhangüera and Dom Pedro I motorways.

The airport is the second largest cargo terminal in Brazil. It is one of the fastest-growing airports in the country, and since it was turned over to the private sector in 2012, a number of improvements and innovations have been implemented through the Viracopos Brazil Airports concession.

Campinas public transportation statistics
The average amount of time people spend commuting with public transit in Campinas, for example to and from work, on a weekday is 77 min. 21% of public transit riders, ride for more than 2 hours every day. The average amount of time people wait at a stop or station for public transit is 23 min, while 52% of riders wait for over 20 minutes on average every day. The average distance people usually ride in a single trip with public transit is 7.9 km, while 16% travel for over 12 km in a single direction.

Education

Portuguese is the official national language, and thus the primary language taught in schools. But English and Spanish are part of the official high school curriculum.

Universities and colleges
 Unicamp (Universidade Estadual de Campinas);
 IFSP (Instituto Federal de São Paulo);
 INPG Business School (Instituto Nacional de Pós-Graduação) - INPG
 PUC-Campinas (Pontifícia Universidade Católica de Campinas);
 UNIP (Universidade Paulista);
 FACAMP (Faculdades de Campinas);
 METROCAMP (Faculdade Integrada Metropolitana de Campinas);
 IPEP (Faculdades Integradas IPEP);
 UNISAL (Centro Universitário Salesiano de São Paulo);
 USF (Universidade São Francisco);
 ESAMC (Escola Superior de Administração, Marketing e Comunicação);
 Universidade Mackenzie;
 FAC (Faculdades Comunitárias de Campinas);
 Faculdades Fleming;
 Faculdade de Odontologia São Leopoldo Mandic.
 Fatec Campinas

Technical schools
 ETE Bento Quirino (Escola Técnica Estadual Bento Quirino)
 ETEC (Escola Técnica de Campinas)
 ETECAP (Escola Técnica Estadual Conselheiro Antonio Prado)
 POLI Bentinho (Colégio Politécnico Bento Quirino)
 COTUCA (Colégio Técnico da Universidade de Campinas)
 SENAI (Serviço Nacional de Aprendizagem Industrial)
 IFSP (Instituto Federal de São Paulo)

Media
Three daily newspapers are published in Campinas, all owned by media company Rede Anhangüera de Comunicação: Correio Popular, Diário do Povo and Notícia Já (a tabloid). Several other local newspapers with weekly or monthly circulation are also published. Several magazines are also published in Campinas, the largest one being Metrópole, which circulates on Sundays as a supplement to Correio Popular.

The city has also a large number of radio stations as well as several local TV stations, including TV Universidades and Fenix TV (both not-for-profit), distributed by Net Campinas, the local cable distributor.

Campinas was the first city in Brazil, outside the capitals of Brazilian states, which received the transmission in digital signal for TV, by EPTV, an affiliate of Rede Globo, on October 3, 2008. It currently has the second TV station that also broadcasts the signal by TVB, now an affiliate of Rede Record, since February 2011 (before SBT, when it began on May 8, 2010).

Notable people

 Campos Sales (politician, fourth president of Brazil)
 Carlos Gomes (opera composer)
 Nelsinho Baptista (footballer)
 Olavo de Carvalho (philosopher and writer)
 Daniel Dias (paralympic swimmer)
 Lovefoxxx (singer)
 Rubem Alves (philosopher and writer)
 Marcelo Damy (physicist)
 Gilberto de Nucci (physician and biomedical researcher)
 Renato M.E. Sabbatini (biomedical scientist and writer)
 Regina Duarte (actress)
 Hércules Florence (inventor)
 Luís Fabiano (footballer)
 Carlos Roberto Martins (entrepreneur)
 Crodowaldo Pavan (biologist and scientist)
 José Aristodemo Pinotti (physician, former dean of UNICAMP)
 Zeferino Vaz (physician, former dean of UNICAMP)
 Hilda Hilst (writer)
 Oliver Minatel (footballer)
 José Pancetti (painter)
 Sandy Leah (singer)
 Fabinho (footballer)

Twin towns – sister cities

Campinas is twinned with:

 Asunción, Paraguay (1973)
 Auroville, India (2004)
 Cabinda, Angola (2009)
 Cascais, Portugal (2012)
 Concepción, Chile (1979)
 Córdoba, Argentina (1993)
 Cotorro (Havana), Cuba (2009)
 Daloa, Ivory Coast (1982)
 Durban, South Africa (2009)
 Fuzhou, China (1996)
 Gifu, Japan (1982)
 Indianapolis, United States (2009)
 Jericho, Palestine (2003)
 Malito, Italy (2006)

 San Diego, United States (1995)
 Viseu, Portugal (2012)
 Zaragoza, Spain (2013)

Cooperative agreements
Campinas signed Cooperation Protocol with:
 Fundão, Portugal (2012)

Domestic cooperation
Campinas cooperates with:

 Belém, Pará (2003)
 Blumenau, Santa Catarina (1983)
 Camanducaia, Minas Gerais (2010)
 Peruíbe, São Paulo (2007)
 Salinas, Minas Gerais (2012)
 Ubatuba, São Paulo (2007)

References

External links 

 Official home page (in Portuguese).
 EncontraCampinas - Find everything about Campinas (in Portuguese)
 The Seven Wonders of Campinas (in Portuguese)
 Other Campinas Tourist Spots (in Portuguese)

 
Populated places established in 1774
1774 establishments in South America